NA-37 Kurram is a constituency for the National Assembly of Pakistan mainly comprising Upper Kurram Subdivision of Kurram District in Khyber Pakhtunkhwa.

Members of Parliament

2002–2018: NA-37 Tribal Area-II

Since 2018: NA-46 Tribal Area-VII

Election 2002 

General elections were held on 10 Oct 2002. Dr Sayed Javaid Hussain Mian an Independent candidate won by 21,053 votes.

Election 2008 

The result of general election 2008 in this constituency is given below.

Result 
Sajid Hussain Turi succeeded in the election 2008 and became the member of National Assembly.

Election 2013 

General elections were held on 11 May 2013. Sajid Hussain an Independent candidate won  by 30,524 votes and became the  member of National Assembly.

Election 2018 

General elections were held on 25 July 2018.

See also
NA-36 Hangu-cum-Orakzai
NA-38 Karak

References

External links 
 Election result's official website

46
46